

Anọ foto 

Oyo East is a Local Government Area in Oyo State, Nigeria. Its headquarters are in the town of Kosobo.

It has an area of 144 km and a population of 123,846 at the 2006 census.

The postal code of the area is 211.

References 

Local Government Areas in Oyo State